John-Luke Roberts is a British stand-up comedian, writer, actor and performer.

Style
Roberts' comedy style is absurdist, and often uses props and physical movement, as taught by French clown Philippe Gaulier with whom Roberts has trained. Roberts uses character comedy within his stand-up.

Roberts has had jokes nominated in the best and worst lists at the Edinburgh festival.

Career
Roberts studied at the University of Cambridge where he was a member of the comedy society. Roberts took part in So You Think You're Funny, and in 2005 was a finalist in the BBC New Comedy Award. Roberts' 2014 Edinburgh show ‘Stnad-up’ concerned in part the end of his relationship with Nadia Kamil, and his 2015 Edinburgh show ‘Stdad-up’ addressed the death of his father.

Roberts founded The Alternative Comedy Memorial Society which he cohosts with Thom Tuck at the Edinburgh Festival Fringe and which has had residencies at the Soho Theatre, The New Red Lion, and The Bill Murray.

Roberts has written for Have I Got News For You, Newzoids and Never Mind the Buzzcocks for the BBC TV as well as The News Quiz, Dilemma and Newsjack for BBC Radio 4. Roberts voiced the computer in Welcome to Our Village, Please Invade Carefully.

In 2015 Roberts' sitcom Bull, co-written with Gareth Gwynn, aired on UKTV Gold, starring Robert Lindsay and Maureen Lipman.

Roberts hosts The Tony Law Tapes podcast with Tony Law. Roberts wrote the 2006 BBC 7 radio show Spats. Roberts has been a guest on The Comedian's Comedian with Stuart Goldsmith. and has appeared as a guest on Do the Right Thing (podcast). Roberts has played comedy internationally such as in Adelaide and Melbourne.

As well as stand-up comedy Roberts has created absurdist plays with fellow comedians such as Mark Watson and Kieran Hodgson and written and performed plays and sketches with Nadia Kamil under the name ‘The Behemoth’.

Roberts wrote and appeared in the short film Asparagus Tips which included appearances by Cariad Lloyd and Margaret Cabourn-Smith and won Best Horror film at the 2019 Munich indie film festival.

Robert's debut stand-up comedy album, It Is Better, is due to be released in 2021 on Monkey Barrel Records.

References

External links
 

Living people
British comedians
English clowns
Year of birth missing (living people)